Lamgoulen Gou Hangshing (born 5 October 1997) is an Indian professional footballer who plays as a defender for Churchill Brothers in the I-League.

Career 
Hangshing made his professional debut for the Churchill Brothers against Punjab F.C. on 28 October 2018, He played till 52nd minute as Churchill Brothers drew 0–0.

Career statistics

Club

References

1997 births
Living people
Churchill Brothers FC Goa players 
Footballers from Manipur
I-League players
Association football midfielders
Indian footballers
I-League 2nd Division players